The Hughes Aircraft Company was a major American aerospace and defense contractor founded on February 14, 1934 by Howard Hughes in Glendale, California, as a division of Hughes Tool Company. The company was known for producing, among other products, the Hughes H-4 Hercules aircraft, the atmospheric entry probe carried by the Galileo spacecraft, and the AIM-4 Falcon guided missile.

Hughes Aircraft was founded to construct Hughes' H-1 Racer world speed record aircraft, and it later modified aircraft for his transcontinental and global circumnavigation speed record flights. The company relocated to Culver City, California, in 1940 and began manufacturing aircraft parts as a subcontractor. Hughes attempted to mold it into a major military aircraft manufacturer during World War II; however, its initial military projects ended in failure, with millions of dollars in U.S. government funds expended but only three aircraft actually built, resulting in a highly publicized U.S. Senate investigation into alleged mismanagement. The U.S. military consequently hesitated to award new aircraft contracts to Hughes Aircraft, prompting new management installed in the late 1940s to instead pursue contracts for fire-control systems and guided missiles, which were then new technologies. The company soon became a highly profitable industry leader in these fields.

In a 1953 accounting maneuver designed to reduce his income tax liabilities, Howard Hughes donated most of Hughes Aircraft's stock and assets to a charity he created, the Howard Hughes Medical Institute (HHMI), and subsequently ceased managing the company directly. Hughes retained a small cadre of engineers under his personal control as the Hughes Tool Company Aircraft Division, which initially operated from the same Culver City complex as Hughes Aircraft, despite being under a separate corporate umbrella. This entity subsequently became fully independent from Hughes Aircraft and changed its name to Hughes Helicopters. After Hughes' 1976 death, Hughes Aircraft was acquired by General Motors from HHMI in 1985 and was put under the umbrella of Hughes Electronics, now known as DirecTV, until GM sold its assets to Raytheon in 1997.

History

During World War II the company designed and built several prototype aircraft at Hughes Airport. These included the famous Hughes H-4 Hercules, better known by the public's nickname for it, the Spruce Goose, the H-1 racer, D-2, and the XF-11. However the plant's hangars at Hughes Airport, location of present-day Playa Vista in the Westside of Los Angeles, California, were primarily used as a branch plant for the construction of other companies' designs. At the start of the war Hughes Aircraft had only four full-time employees—by the end the number was 80,000.  During the war, the company was awarded contracts to build B-25 struts, centrifugal cannons, and machine gun feed chutes.

Post–World War II
Hughes Aircraft was one of many aerospace and defense companies which flourished in Southern California during and after World War II and was at one time the largest employer in the area.

Yet, employment had dropped to 800 by 1947. By the summer of 1947 certain politicians had become concerned about Hughes' alleged mismanagement of the Spruce Goose and the XF-11 photo reconnaissance plane project. They formed a special committee to investigate Hughes which culminated in a much-followed Senate investigation, one of the first to be televised to the public. Despite a highly critical committee report, Hughes was cleared.

The company then expanded into the booming electronics field, eventually employing 3,300 Ph.D.s.  Hughes hired Ira Eaker, Harold L. George, and Tex Thornton to run the company.  By 1953, the company employed 17,000 and had $600,000,000 in government contracts.

In 1948 Hughes created a new division of the company, the Aerospace Group. Two Hughes engineers, Simon Ramo and Dean Wooldridge, had new ideas on the packaging of electronics to make complete fire control systems. Their MA-1 system combined signals from the aircraft's radar with a digital computer to automatically guide the interceptor aircraft into the proper position for firing missiles.  At the same time other teams were working with the newly formed US Air Force on air-to-air missiles, delivering the AIM-4 Falcon, then known as the F-98.  The MA-1/Falcon package, with several upgrades, was the primary interceptor weapon system of the USAF for many years, lasting into the 1980s.  Ramo and Wooldridge, having failed to reach an agreement with Howard Hughes regarding management problems, resigned in September 1953 and founded the Ramo-Wooldridge Corporation, later to join Thompson Products to form the Thompson-Ramo-Wooldridge based in Canoga Park, with Hughes leasing space for nuclear research programs (present day West Hills (Canoga Park)).  The company became TRW in 1965, another aerospace company and a major competitor to Hughes Aircraft.

In 1951 Hughes Aircraft Co. built a missile plant in Tucson, Arizona. The construction of this plant, wrote David Leighton, in the Arizona Daily Star newspaper, was due to "Howard Hughes’ long-held fear that his plant in Culver City, California, was vulnerable to enemy attack because it was on the Pacific Coast." By the end of that year, the U.S. Air Force had purchased the property but allowed the company to continue to run day to day operations of the site. This Tucson plant is still in operation under the ownership of Raytheon Missiles & Defense.

Howard Hughes donated Hughes Aircraft to the newly formed Howard Hughes Medical Institute (HHMI) in 1953 allegedly as a way of avoiding taxes on its huge income. The next year, L.A. "Pat" Hyland was hired as vice president and general manager of Hughes Aircraft; he would ultimately become company president and CEO after Howard Hughes' death in 1976.

Under Hyland's guidance, the Aerospace Group continued to diversify and become massively profitable, and became a primary focus of the company. The company developed radar systems, electro-optical systems, the first working laser, aircraft computer systems, missile systems, ion-propulsion engines (for space travel), and many other advanced technologies. The 'Electronic Properties Information Center' (EPIC) of the United States was hosted at the Hughes Culver City library in the 1970s. EPIC published the multi-volume Handbook of Electronic Materials as public documents.

Nobel Laureates Richard Feynman and Murray Gell-Mann had Hughes connections: Feynman would hold weekly seminars at Hughes Research Laboratories; Gell-Mann shared an office with Malcolm Currie, later a chairman of the board and chief executive officer at Hughes Aircraft. Greg Jarvis and Ronald McNair, two of the astronauts on the last flight of the Space Shuttle Challenger, were Hughes alumni.

Ground Systems Group
Hughes Aircraft Ground Systems Group was located in Fullerton, California. The facility was 3 million square feet and included manufacturing, laboratories, offices, and a Munson road test course. It designed developed and produced the Air Defense Systems that replaced the Semi Automatic Defense Ground Environment (SAGE) in the United States with the Joint Surveillance System (JSS) AN/FYQ-93 including NORAD with Joint Tactical Information Distribution System (JTIDS) and provided defense systems and air traffic control systems around the world. These systems are massive and at its peak Ground Systems Group employed 15,000 people and generated revenue in excess of $1 billion per year.

These systems included the following Ground Systems Group subsystems: Computer H5118, Consoles HMD-22 and HMD-44, Liquid Crystal Large Screen Displays, and Software that set the standard for software development based on science and engineering starting with the Combat Grande System. Ground Systems Group was known to push technology envelopes in the computers, displays, local area networks, human interfaces, and software in their systems. They also blazed the path to very highly distributed human intensive systems.

Hughes Space and Communications Group 

Hughes Space and Communications Group and the Hughes Space Systems Division built the world's first geosynchronous communications satellite, Syncom, in 1963 and followed by the first geosynchronous weather satellite, ATS-1, in 1966. Later that year their Surveyor 1 made the first soft landing on the Moon as part of the lead-up to the moon landings in Project Apollo. Hughes also built Pioneer Venus in 1978, which performed the first extensive radar mapping of Venus, and the Galileo probe that flew to Jupiter in the 1990s. The company built nearly 40 percent of commercial satellites in service worldwide in 2000.

Hughes helicopter business

In 1947, Howard Hughes redirected Hughes Aircraft's efforts from airplanes to helicopters. The effort began in earnest in 1948, when helicopter manufacturer Kellett Aircraft Co. sold its latest design to Hughes for production. The XH-17 "Sky Crane" first flew in October 1952, but was commercially unsuccessful. In 1955, Howard Hughes split the helicopter production unit from the Hughes Aircraft Company, and reconstituted it with Hughes Tool Company, calling it Hughes Tool Company's Aircraft Division. The Aircraft Division had a focus on the production of light helicopters, mainly the Hughes 269/300 and the OH-6 Cayuse/Hughes 500.

Howard Hughes Medical Institute sells Hughes Aircraft Company
Hughes left no will and following his death in 1976 there were numerous claims to his estate. A Hughes executive and a Hughes lawyer claimed they had the right to set up an "executive committee" to take over the running of the HHMI and its Hughes Aircraft subsidiary. The Attorney General of Delaware Richard R. Wier challenged this and filed suit in 1978. Charles M. Oberly continued the action when he became attorney general in 1983. Oberly stated he wished to see an independent board of trustees to ensure both that the institute fulfilled its charitable mission and that it did not continue to operate as a tax shelter.

In January 1984 Judge Grover C. Brown ruled that the Chancery Court should appoint the trustees because Hughes had not left a succession plan. Brown asked for both the executive committee and the attorney general's office to submit a list of recommendations that he could approve. Brown approved a list in April 1984. In January 1985 the new board of trustees of the HHMI announced they would sell Hughes Aircraft either by private sale or public stock offering.

Hughes Electronics Corporation

On June 5, 1985, General Motors was announced as the winner of a secretive five-month sealed-bid auction. Other bidders included Ford Motor Company and Boeing. The purchase was completed on December 20, 1985, for an estimated $5.2 billion, $2.7 billion in cash and the rest in 50 million shares of GM Class H stock.

On December 31, 1985, General Motors merged Hughes Aircraft with its Delco Electronics unit to form Hughes Electronics Corporation, an independent subsidiary. The group then consisted of: Delco Electronics Corporation and Hughes Aircraft Company.

In August 1992 Hughes Aircraft completed its purchase of General Dynamics' missile businesses for $450 million. This brought the Tomahawk Cruise Missile, Advanced Cruise Missile, Standard missile, Stinger missile, Phalanx Close-in weapon system, and Rolling Airframe Missile into Hughes' portfolio.

In 1994 Hughes Electronics introduced DirecTV, the world's first high-powered DBS service. In 1995 Hughes Electronic's Hughes Space and Communications division became the largest supplier of commercial satellites. Also in 1995 the group purchased Magnavox Electronic Systems from the Carlyle Group. In 1996 Hughes Electronics and PanAmSat agree to merge their fixed satellite services into a new publicly held company, also called PanAmSat with Hughes Electronics as majority shareholder.

In 1995, Hughes Aircraft sold its Technology Products Division (automated wire and die bonder) to an investor group led by Citicorp and incorporated the division as Palomar Technologies. In 2008, Citicorp sold the bonder division to the current management team at Palomar Technologies.

In 1997 GM transferred Delco Electronics to its Delphi Automotive Systems business. Later that year the assets of Hughes Aircraft were sold to Raytheon for $9.5 billion. The remaining companies remained under the Hughes Electronics name and within GM.

In 2000, the Boeing Company purchased three units within Hughes Electronics Corp.: Hughes Space and Communications Co., Hughes Electron Dynamics, and Spectrolab Inc., in addition to Hughes Electronics' interest in HRL, the company's primary research laboratory. The four joined Boeing Satellite Systems, a company subsidiary, later becoming the Satellite Development Center, part of Boeing Integrated Defense Systems.

In 2003 the remaining parts of Hughes Electronics (DirecTV, DirecTV Latin America, PanAmSat, Hughes Network Systems) were purchased by News Corporation from GM and renamed The DirecTV Group.

Corporate legacy
The wide range of science and technology developed by Hughes Aircraft never included medical applications because the company was owned by the Howard Hughes Medical Institute (HHMI).  This restriction was imposed to avoid even the appearance of a conflict of interest.

The money provided to HHMI by Hughes Aircraft led to major improvements in genetics and cancer research.

The city of Fullerton, California, named Hughes Drive after the site that the company formerly occupied before 1997. After Hughes closed, the city developed Amerige Heights, a residential community.

Timeline

 1932: Howard Hughes formed Hughes Aircraft Company as a division of Hughes Tool Company.
 1948: Hughes formed the Aerospace Group within the company, divided into:
 Hughes Space and Communications Group
 Hughes Space Systems Division
 1951: Hughes Aircraft opened missile plant in Tucson, Arizona.
 1953: The Howard Hughes Medical Institute (HHMI) was formed, and Hughes Aircraft reformed as a subsidiary of the foundation. The Internal Revenue Service unsuccessfully challenged its "charitable" status which made it tax-exempt.
 1955: Hughes formed its helicopter division, Aircraft Division.
 1960: The first laser was produced at Hughes Research Laboratories, by Theodore Maiman.
 1961: Hughes Research Laboratories completed their move to Malibu, California.
 1972: Hughes sold the tool division of Hughes Tool Company. His remaining interests were transferred to the newly formed holding company, the Summa Corporation. This included Toolco Aircraft and Hughes' property and other businesses.
 1976: Toolco Aircraft became Hughes Helicopters.
 1976: Howard Hughes died at the age of 70, leaving no will.
 1984: The Summa Corporation sold Hughes Helicopters to McDonnell Douglas for $500 million; it was soon renamed McDonnell Douglas Helicopters.
 1984: The Delaware Court of Chancery appointed eight trustees to the Howard Hughes Medical Institute; they decided to sell Hughes Aircraft.
 1985: The HHMI sold Hughes Aircraft to General Motors for $5.2 billion. This was merged with GM's Delco Electronics to form Hughes Electronics Corporation. This group then consisted of:
 Delco Electronics Corporation
 Hughes Aircraft Company
 1987: Hughes Aircraft Company acquired M/A-COM Telecommunications, to form Hughes Network Systems.
 1994: Hughes Electronics introduced DirecTV'.
 1995: Hughes Space and Communications Company became the world's biggest supplier of commercial satellites.
 1995: Hughes Electronics acquired Magnavox Electronic Systems from the Carlyle Group.
 1995: Hughes Aircraft acquired CAE-Link; CAE-Link was part of the original company founded by Edwin Link, inventor of the flight simulator.
 1996: Hughes Electronics and PanAmSat agreed to merge their fixed satellite services into a new publicly held company, also called PanAmSat with Hughes Electronics as majority shareholder.
 1997: GM transferred Delco Electronics from Hughes Electronics to its Delphi Automotive Systems. Delphi became independent in 1999.
 1997: The aerospace and defense operations of Hughes Electronics (Hughes Aircraft) merged with Raytheon; Raytheon also acquired one half of the Hughes Research Laboratories.
 2000: Hughes Space and Communications Company remained independent until 2000, when it was purchased by Boeing and became Boeing Satellite Development Center. Boeing purchased one third of the HRL Laboratories, LLC which was then co-owned by Boeing, GM and Raytheon.
 2003: The remaining parts of Hughes Electronics: DirecTV, DirecTV Latin America, PanAmSat and Hughes Network Systems were purchased by NewsCorp and renamed The DirecTV Group.
 2003: Newscorp sold PanAmSat to Kohlberg Kravis Roberts & Co. (KKR) in August 2004.
 2004: Director Martin Scorsese used the Hughes Aircraft stage in Playa Vista to film the motion-capture sequences in the film The Aviator.
 2004: SkyTerra Communications, Inc. completed its purchase of 100% controlling interest in Hughes Network Systems from the DirecTV Group in January 2006.

Technologies Systems and Products

Air Defense and Air Traffic Control Systems
 Japanese Tactical Air Weapons Control System - JTAWCS
 Swiss Air Defense System - FLORIDA
 Spain Air Defense System - Combat Grande
 Tactical Air Weapons Control System
 Joint Surveillance System
 German Air Defense Ground Environment (GEADGE)
 Integrated NATO Air Defense System
 NATO Air Defence Ground Environment (NADGE) - NSPA
 Airborne Early Warning / Ground Environment Integration Segment (AEGIS)
 Canadian Air Traffic Control System
 Korean Air Traffic Control System
 Joint Tactical Information Distribution System (JTIDS)
 AN/MPQ-64 Sentinel
 AN/TPQ-36 Firefinder radar
 AN/TPQ-37 Firefinder radar

Hughes Research Laboratories
 HRL Laboratories

Howard Hughes Medical Institute
 Howard Hughes Medical Institute

Aircraft
 Hughes D-2
 Hughes H-1
 Hughes H-4 Hercules
 Hughes XF-11

Missiles
 AIM-4 Falcon
 AIM-26 Falcon
 AIM-47 Falcon
 AIM-54 Phoenix
 AIM-120 AMRAAM
 AGM-65 Maverick
 BGM-71 TOW
 Brazo

Spacecraft
 HS-333
 Anik (satellite)
 Jarvis (rocket)
 Magellan (spacecraft)
 Morelos Satellite System
 Paksat-1 satellite
 Pioneer program
 Pioneer Venus Multiprobe
 Pioneer Venus Orbiter
 Surveyor program
 Surveyor 1
 Surveyor 2
 Surveyor 3
 Surveyor 4
 Surveyor 5
 Surveyor 6
 Surveyor 7

 Torpedo 
 Mk-48 ADCAP

 References 

Bibliography
 
 
 Gart, Jason H. "Electronics and Aerospace Industry in Cold War Arizona, 1945–1968: Motorola, Hughes Aircraft, Goodyear Aircraft". Ph.D. diss., Arizona State University, 2006.
 Marrett, George J. Howard Hughes: Aviator, Naval Institute Press, 2004.
 Marrett, George J. Testing Death: Hughes Aircraft Test Pilots and Cold War Weaponry, Praeger Publishing, 2006.
 Parker, Dana T. Building Victory: Aircraft Manufacturing in the Los Angeles Area in World War II, Cypress, CA. .
 D. Kenneth Richardson (2011).  Hughes After Howard: The Story of Hughes Aircraft Company.  Sea Hill Press. .
 Walter Sobkiw (2011). Systems Practices as Common Sense''. CassBeth. .

External links

Hughes aircraft history on CentennialofFlight.net

 
Aircraft
Aerospace companies of the United States
Defense companies of the United States
Electronics companies of the United States
Guided missile manufacturers
Spacecraft manufacturers
Defunct aircraft manufacturers of the United States
Defunct helicopter manufacturers of the United States
Technology companies based in Greater Los Angeles
Companies based in Culver City, California
American companies established in 1932
Electronics companies established in 1932
Manufacturing companies established in 1932
Technology companies established in 1932
Manufacturing companies disestablished in 1987
Technology companies disestablished in 1987
1932 establishments in California
1987 disestablishments in California
Defunct manufacturing companies based in Greater Los Angeles
Boeing mergers and acquisitions
Former General Motors subsidiaries
Historic American Engineering Record in California